RAD Soldiers is a turn-based strategy video game developed by Splash Damage and published by Warchest Ltd. for iOS in 2012.

Reception

The game received "favorable" reviews according to the review aggregation website Metacritic.

References

External links
 

2012 video games
IOS games
IOS-only games
Single-player video games
Splash Damage games
Turn-based strategy video games
Video games developed in the United Kingdom